"Shoggoths in Bloom" is a science fiction novelette by Elizabeth Bear, originally published in the March 2008 issue of the American magazine Asimov's Science Fiction, and subsequently republished in Bear's 2012 collection Shoggoths in Bloom.

Plot summary
In 1938, Paul Harding is a black college professor who has come to a coastal Maine village to study the wild shoggoths. As news reports of Kristallnacht appear in the background, Harding discovers the unexpected truth about shoggoths, and is faced with a difficult decision.

Reception
"Shoggoths" was the winner of the 2009 Hugo Award for Best Novelette. Tor.com called it a "stand-out".

References

External links 
 
 Partial text of the story at Asimov's Science Fiction

Fiction set in 1938
2008 short stories
Cthulhu Mythos short stories
Fantasy short stories
Hugo Award for Best Novelette winning works
Maine in fiction
Science fiction short stories
Works by Elizabeth Bear
Works originally published in Asimov's Science Fiction